Fathabad (also Romanized as Fatḩābād; also known as Fatḩābād-e Pā’īn) is a village in Zagheh Rural District, Zagheh District, Khorramabad County, Lorestan Province, Iran. At the 2006 census, its population was 148, in 36 families.

References 

Towns and villages in Khorramabad County